Podgora is a village in the municipalities of Lopare (Republika Srpska) and Sapna, Tuzla Canton, Bosnia and Herzegovina.

Demographics 
According to the 2013 census, its population was 231, all living in the Lopare part, thus none in Sapna.

References

Populated places in Lopare
Populated places in Sapna